The Robert J. And Claire Pasarow Foundation Medical Research Awards were awarded annually for distinguished accomplishment in areas of investigation that included neuropsychiatry, cardiovascular disease, and cancer research. The program ran from 1987 to 2013. Each area of research was allocated US$50,000 to award to its winners.

History of the award 

The Pasarow Foundation was created in 1987 by Mr. and Mrs. Pasarow of Beverly Hills, California, to stimulate medical and scientific research. Robert Pasarow was the founder and former president/CEO/chairman of the board of CHB Foods, Inc. The Pasarows established the Claire and Robert J. Pasarow Cancer Laboratory at the Kenneth Norris Jr. Cancer Hospital and Research Institute at the University of Southern California as well as the Pasarow Mass Spectrometry Laboratory at the University of California Los Angeles. Robert J. Pasarow, now deceased, was the founding president and chairman of the foundation and Claire Pasarow, also deceased, was the chief financial officer.

Members of the board of directors 

The members of the board of directors were:
 Michael Pasarow, chairman
 Anthony Pasarow, co-treasurer
 Susan A. Pasarow, MSW, co-treasurer
 Jack Barchas, MD, president
 , MD, PhD, University of California San Francisco
 Christopher J. Evans, PhD, University of California, Los Angeles
 Ronald Evans, PhD, The Salk Institute
 Brian E. Henderson, MD, University of Southern California
 Alexander Varshavsky, PhD, Caltech

Nomination criteria 

The principal criterion for nomination was evidence of extraordinary accomplishment in medical science.

Nominators provided a one-page letter of intent stating the rationale for the nomination and a copy of the nominee's curriculum vitae and bibliography in two-page NIH format. Applications were reviewed by the board of directors in consultation with various medical scholars.

Past winners

See also

 List of medicine awards

References

American science and technology awards
Cancer research awards
Medicine awards
Awards established in 1987